The Odesa Military Academy is a modern higher military institution of the inter-services Armed Forces of Ukraine. It is one of the oldest military academies in the former Russian Empire, having been active for more than a century. has deep historical traditions and more than a century of history. The academy conducts language training for servicemen and employees of the Armed Forces of Ukraine, advanced training of military personnel and scientific and pedagogical workers, and the preparation of students in the training of reserve officers.

Origins

Creation
The academy was founded as the Odesa Infantry School in 1865, by order of the Minister of War. It was then intended to be a preparatory school that trains infantrymen to serve as a military officer rank. The building of the school was designed by the Russian architect Vasily F. Maas. The military academy was succeeded by the Cadet Corps, which was created on April 16, 1899, by direct the order of Nicholas II, according to the order of creating the school. The idea for creating the cadet corps came from the commander of the Odesa Military District, Count Alexander Ivanovich Musin-Pushkin, who in the mid-1890s recognized the need for the establishment of a special military educational institution in the city of Odesa.

Soviet era
In July 1919, the courses were reorganized into the Military School of the Eastern Front. During the Russian Civil War, courses and schools were repeatedly relocated as the Red Army advanced to Ukraine. In July 1941, the school was redeployed to the Saratov Oblast. In December 1943, the school was given the honorific of Mikhail Frunze. In 1947, it was named the Kiev United College of Self-propelled Artillery. In July 1954, the school was redesignated the Kiev Tank School and was then called the Kiev Command and Technical School, before being renamed to the Kiev Higher Combined Arms Command School. In 1943 and 1968, the school was awarded the Order of the Red Banner. In 1968, it became the senior educational institution of the Soviet Armed Forces for the training of officers of military intelligence units.

Reorganization
By the decree of the Cabinet of Ministers of Ukraine on August 19, 1992, the school was closed. Since the fall of the Soviet Union, the school remained largely inactive until the military academy was reestablished on June 30, 2011, on the basis of the Military Institute of the Odesa National Polytechnic University in accordance with the Decree of the Cabinet of Ministers of Ukraine signed on March 23, 2011.

Until that date the Military Institute, formerly the Ground Forces Institute of Odesa created in the fall of 1992, carried the traditions of the academy.

Specialties 
Training is conducted in 12 military accounting specialties:

 Mechanized formations
 Airborne, mountain infantry and marine units
 Special intelligence
 Military intelligence
 Special purpose units (except naval)
 Special purpose units of the Ukrainian Navy
 Communication units
 Material and technical means 
 Food supply
 Material support
 Repair of small arms and melee weapons
 Psychology

Cadet activities and traditions

On 14 July 2014, a contingent from the academy took part in the Bastille Day military parade dedicated to the 100th anniversary of the start of the First World War in Paris. A group of cadets and military musicians led by Lieutenant Colonel Mykola Konovalyuk took part in parade training for a week prior on the Champs Elysees, with another Ukrainian delegation of seven representatives of the school who speak French and English marching in a color guard procession and participating in other theatrical actions.

Cadets of the academy in 2016 took part in the Chișinău Independence Day Parade on Great National Assembly Square.

Awards 

 Medal "For the Defence of Odesa"

Academy band
The Band of the Odesa Military Academy was established in December 2012 and has its origin from the 9th Military Band of the Soviet Army (established in 1964) and the local Song and Dance Ensemble (established in 1939). In 1988, the former won first place at a Moscow competition of small military bands of the Soviet Armed Forces. The choir group of the ensemble showed their art in 1993 at the Leontovich Choir Competition, where it won the 1st place, and in 1995 the dance group became the Laureate of the International Folk Dance Competition in Samsun, Turkey. Today, the small ensembles that are part of the band include a parade band, a jazz band, a ballet group, brass and chamber quintets as well as a concert band. The band represents the academy at all military occasions and the country at international military festivals.

Notable alumni of the academy and its predecessors 
 Mohamed Kahin Ahmed
 Rovshan Akbarov
 Oleksiy Arestovych
 Murat Bektanov
 Kyrylo Budanov
 Leonid Maltsev
 Ivan Panfilov
 Serhiy Popko

External links

 Official Website

References 

1865 establishments in the Russian Empire
Odesa Military Academy
Educational institutions established in 1865
1865 establishments in Ukraine